Metarctia longipalpis is a moth of the subfamily Arctiinae. It was described by Gustaaf Hulstaert in 1923. It is found in the Democratic Republic of the Congo.

References

Metarctia
Moths described in 1923
Endemic fauna of the Democratic Republic of the Congo